El Ratón Pérez is a 2006 Spanish-Argentine film directed by Juan Pablo Buscarini, starring Delfina Varni, Nicolas Torcanowsky and the voices of Alejandro Awada as Ratón Perez, Mariano Chiesa as Commander Fugaz and Roly Serrano as El Rata. The film includes 3D animated characters created by the Patagonik Film Group in Argentina, and Filmax Animation in Spain. It was followed by a 2008 sequel, El Ratón Pérez 2.

The film was screened at the 2006 Toronto International Film Festival, under the English title The Hairy Tooth Fairy. Ratón Peréz is the Argentine-Spanish version of the tooth fairy.

Plot
This is the story of Lucía, a restless kid who suffers a domestic accident and loses a tooth. Santiago, her father, an unemployed chef and Pilar, her mother, a successful architect with work to spare, ease her with the illusion that Ratón Pérez will stop by her room that night, take her tooth and replace it with some money. What they don't know is that the alert sign is already being spread...

A little mouse spying the situation warns another mouse who then warns another who warns another who finally warns... Ratón Pérez! who lives on a boat anchored at the port along with hundreds of mice who gather the teeth, clean, sculpt and polish them to turn them into shiny round pearls. These are taken through the city sewers to a jewelry store own by Morientes - an old friend of Pérez that trades them paying the teeth's weight in gold coins.

What should have been a routine job for the mythical mouse won't be tonight since the most heartless and ambitious thugs decide to kidnap Pérez and take control of his boat and his fortune.

This would be the end of the story for everyone except for Lucía who - with the help of her cousin Ramiro - disobeying her parents and not measuring the consequences will try to rescue Pérez unleashing a fascinating adventure that will prove that you don't have to be a kid to believe.

The story was based partially on the Ratoncito Pérez, a character in Spanish folklore similar to the Tooth fairy.

Cast

Voices
 Alejandro Awada - Ratón Pérez
 Mariano Chiesa - Commander Fugaz
 Roly Serrano - El rata

Humans
 Nicolás Torcanowski - Ramiro
 Delfina Varni - Lucía
 Fabián Mazzei - Santiago
 Ana María Orozco - Pilar
 Joe Rígoli - Justo Amancio Morientes
 Diego Gentile - Pipo
 Ana María Nazar - Condesa
 Enrique Porcellana - Gordo
 Fernanda Bodria - Maestra
 Anahí Martella - Samanta
 Fernando Paz - Hormiga
 Marcos Metta - Professor
 Pedro Martínez Goncalvez - Alumno 1

References

External links

2006 films
Argentine animated films
2006 computer-animated films
2006 fantasy films
Animated films about mice
Films with live action and animation
Spanish animated films
2000s Spanish-language films
Best Animated Film Goya Award winners
2006 animated films
Films distributed by Disney
2000s Spanish films
2000s Argentine films
Tooth fairies